Dmitri Makarov may refer to:

 Dmitri Makarov (footballer) (born 1982), retired Russian footballer
 Dmitri Makarov (ice hockey) (born 1983), Russian ice hockey winger